Palma Sola may refer to:

Alphabetical by country
 Palma Sola, Jujuy, Argentina
 Palmasola, a maximum security prison in Santa Cruz, Bolivia
 Palma Sola, Santa Catarina, Brazil
 Mataguá, formerly Palma Sola, a village in Cuba
 Palma Sola, Dominican Republic
 Palma Sola massacre, 1962
 Palma Sola, Florida, US
 Palma Sola Bay, Florida, US
 Palma Sola (Puerto Rico)
 Palmasola Municipality, Falcón, Venezuela